Chang Shou-chung (born 15 January 1955) is a Taiwanese judoka. He competed in the men's middleweight event at the 1984 Summer Olympics.

References

1955 births
Living people
Taiwanese male judoka
Olympic judoka of Taiwan
Judoka at the 1984 Summer Olympics
Place of birth missing (living people)